The 2009 Winnipeg Blue Bombers season was the 52nd season for the team in the Canadian Football League and their 77th overall. The Blue Bombers were in the playoff hunt until the last game of the season, at home, against the Hamilton Tiger-Cats, but lost the game and failed to qualify for the playoffs for the first time since 2005, finishing the season with a disappointing 7–11 record.

Off-season 
On February 18, Milt Stegall announced his retirement from the Blue Bombers.

New coach Mike Kelly made many roster moves to re-shape the team that lost the 95th Grey Cup in 2007 and slid to an 8 win and 10 loss record in the 2008 season.

CFL draft 
The 2009 CFL Draft took place on May 2, 2009. Due to trades, the Blue Bombers did not have a selection until the third round, when they chose lineman Mike Morris from UBC.

Notable transactions 
On February 18, Riall Johnson was acquired by the Winnipeg Blue Bombers, from the Toronto Argonauts for import middle linebacker Zeke Moreno and a conditional draft pick.

Pre-season

Regular season

Division standings

Season schedule

Roster

Statistics

Offence

Passing

Rushing

Receiving

Awards and records

Playoffs
The Blue Bombers finished third in the East Division with a record of 7 wins and 11 losses. The BC Lions, who finished fourth in the West, had a better record of 8 wins and 10 losses, and under the cross-over rule eliminated Winnipeg from the playoffs. The Lions went on to play the Hamilton Tiger-Cats in the East semi-final at Ivor Wynne Stadium, winning 34-27 in overtime before losing to the Montreal Alouettes in Montreal in the East Final.

References

Winnipeg Blue Bombers